The Regions of Britain is a book series of topographical guides to the British regions published by Robert Hale and Company, by Eyre & Spottiswoode and by Eyre Methuen in the 1970s. The series included a blend of historical and contemporary material and it was the practice of the publishers to use authors native to the regions they wrote about such as S. H. Burton of Devon who wrote about the West Country, Marcus Crouch on the Home Counties was from Middlesex, and Arthur Raistrick who wrote about the Pennines was from Yorkshire. John Talbot White, a noted naturalist of Goldsmiths College, wrote two volumes for the series including on Kent, Surrey and Sussex, an area of Britain about which he wrote three other books after having become fascinated by it after he was evacuated from London to the Kent/Sussex border as a boy during the Second World War.

This is an incomplete list of volumes:

See also
 County Books series
 Portrait Books series
 The Regional Books

References

1970s books
Books about the United Kingdom
Robert Hale (publishers)
Series of non-fiction books
Robert Hale books